Located in Olney, Maryland, the Olney Theatre Center offers a diverse array of professional productions year-round that enrich, nurture, and challenge a broad range of artists, audiences and students. There are three indoor venues: the Historic Theatre, the Mainstage, and the  Mulitz-Gudelsky Theatre Lab. There is also an outdoor venue,  the Root Family Stage. 

The Mainstage seats 429 patrons, with a small theatre lab added in 1999. 

As of May 2016, Olney Theatre Center has won 18 Helen Hayes Awards since the award's founding in 1985, and received 146 nominations. It one of only two theaters in the country to operate under an Actors' Equity Association Council of Stock Theaters (COST) contract.

History 
In 1938, Olney Theatre was founded as a summer theater and restaurant by Stephen E. Cochran, attorney and judge Harold C. Smith, and theater manager Leonard B. McLaughlin. Martin Platt was hired as the new artistic director. Platt resigned after six months. Jason Loewith became the new artistic director in 2013.

In 2016, Olney Theatre had a mortgage of $4.8 million, down from $6 million in 2013. The operating budget for the 2016 season was a little less than $6 million.

See also

 Helen Hayes Award

Further reading

References

External links
 
 Pressley, Nelson (August 10, 2008). " On the Boards in the Burbs: Challenging Works". The Washington Post. 

Olney, Maryland
Theatres in Maryland
Tourist attractions in Montgomery County, Maryland
Event venues established in 1938
League of Washington Theatres
1938 establishments in Maryland